The  is a 16.1 km railway line owned by the third-sector company Heisei Chikuhō Railway. The line runs north from Tagawa to Nōgata, all within Fukuoka Prefecture.

History

The line was first built by the Chikuhō Kōgyō Railway, later renamed , as a branch line of the Chikuhō Main Line. Used to transport coal from the Chikuhō coal mine, the line had two stations: Nōgata Station and Kanada Station. The entire Chikuhō Railway system was merged in 1897 with Kyushu Railway, where the line was extended to Ita Station (now Tagawa-Ita Station) in 1899. Kyushu Railway was nationalized in 1907 and was merged into Japanese Government Railway.

Even though the Ita Line was widened to a double-track railway in 1911, ridership suffered with the decline of the Chikuhō coal mine. Therefore, JR Kyushu, the successor of Japanese Government Railway, privatized and transferred the Ita Line, Itoda Line, and Tagawa Line to the newly founded Heisei Chikuhō Railway.

Even after privatization, the Japan Freight Railway Company still ran trains from Kanada north to Mojiko Station in Kitakyushu, transporting cement from a Mitsui Tankō plant near Kanada Station. This service ceased with the plant's closure in March 2004.

Operations
The line is not electrified and is single-tracked for the entire line. Some services continue past Kanada Station on the Itoda Line to Tagawa-Gotōji Station.

Stations
All stations are within Fukuoka Prefecture.

References

 
Railway lines in Japan
Rail transport in Fukuoka Prefecture
Railway lines opened in 1893
Japanese third-sector railway lines